Joseph John Oswald "Jake" Sheppard (July 27, 1902 – August 28, 1969) was a Canadian professional ice hockey forward who played nine seasons in the National Hockey League with the Detroit Cougars, New York Americans, Boston Bruins and Chicago Black Hawks from 1926 to 1934. Johnny was the brother of the former NHL player, Frank Sheppard. He was born in Montreal, Quebec, but grew up in Selkirk, Manitoba.

Playing career
Sheppard began his career with the Selkirk Jr. Fisherman of the Manitoba Junior Hockey League and Edmonton Eskimos of the Western Canada Hockey League. He joined the Detroit Cougars in the team's inaugural season of 1926–27, in which he played 43 games and led the team in goals (13), assists (8), points (21), and penalty minutes (60). On November 22, 1927, Sheppard scored the first goal at the new Detroit Olympia against Ottawa Senators' goaltender Alex Connell.

Sheppard was traded to the New York Americans, where he played five seasons and posted career highs in goals (17 in 1932–33) and points (29 in 1929–30). He also played for the Bronx Tigers of the Canadian-American Hockey League in 1931–32. Before his final NHL season in 1933–34, Sheppard was traded from the Americans to the Bruins, who released him after four games. He signed with the Black Hawks and helped the team win the Stanley Cup.

Career statistics

Regular season and playoffs

Awards and achievements
 Stanley Cup Championships (1934)

References

External links

1902 births
1969 deaths
Boston Bruins players
Bronx Tigers players
Canadian ice hockey left wingers
Chicago Blackhawks players
Detroit Cougars players
Edmonton Eskimos (ice hockey) players
Ice hockey people from Manitoba
New York Americans players
People from Selkirk, Manitoba
Seattle Seahawks (ice hockey) players
Selkirk Jr. Fishermen players
Stanley Cup champions